Pallavi is a 1977 Indian Malayalam film, directed by B. K. Pottekkad and produced by T. P. Haridas. The film stars Jayabharathi, T. R. Omana, Bahadoor and M. G. Soman. The film has musical score by Kannur Rajan.

Cast
Jayabharathi 
T. R. Omana 
Bahadoor 
M. G. Soman 
Rajakokila 
Vincent

Soundtrack
The music was composed by Kannur Rajan with lyrics by Parathulli Raveendran and P. Bhaskaran.

References

External links
 

1977 films
1970s Malayalam-language films